Brandywine Realty Trust is a real estate investment trust that invests in office buildings in Philadelphia, Washington, D.C., and Austin.

As of December 31, 2019, the company owned interests in 173 properties containing 24.3 million net rentable square feet.

History
The company was founded in 1994.

In 1998, the company acquired a portfolio of 23 properties for $229 million, an office park for $48.5 million, and a 68 property portfolio.

In 2001, the company completed an asset exchange with Prentiss Properties Trust.

In 2005, the company completed the development of the Cira Centre, designed by César Pelli, next to Philadelphia's 30th Street Station.

In 2006, the company acquired Prentiss Properties Trust for $3.3 billion.

In 2010, the company completed the renovation of Cira Square, a former U.S. post office building that was leased to the General Services Administration for occupancy by the Internal Revenue Service.

In 2013, the company acquired Commerce Square for $331.8 million.

In 2016, the company sold a portfolio of 58 office properties for $398.1 million.

References

External links

Real estate companies established in 1994
Financial services companies established in 1994
1994 establishments in Pennsylvania
Companies based in Philadelphia
Companies listed on the New York Stock Exchange
Real estate investment trusts of the United States